Janne Katajisto (born 13 March 1978) is a Finnish former professional boxer who competed from 2009 to 2014. He challenged once for the European Union heavyweight title in 2014, and won the Finnish heavyweight title in 2011.

Amateur career
As an amateur, Katajisto won consecutive gold medals in the super-heavyweight division at the 2001 and 2002 Finnish national championships. At the 2001 event he defeated Robert Helenius in the first round, and in 2002 defeated him again in the final.

Professional career
Katajisto made his professional debut on 8 August 2009, knocking out Igor Evseev in the first round. He won the Finnish heavyweight title on 24 September 2011, in a seventh-round stoppage over Petter Antman. Katajisto's first career loss came against Arnold Gjergjaj on 23 March 2013, who knocked him out in three rounds. A second loss came against future world heavyweight title challenger Johann Duhaupas on 5 April 2014, which was for the European Union heavyweight title. Katajisto was knocked out in the seventh round.

Professional boxing record

References

External links

Finnish male boxers
Heavyweight boxers
1978 births
People from Kankaanpää
Living people
Sportspeople from Satakunta